Newag Impuls is a family of standard-gauge electric, diesel and bi-mode (hybrid) multiple units manufactured by Polish railway rolling stock manufacturer Newag. Manufactured in several versions, they differ in the number of cars and purpose. Offered are electric 2-car (types 37WE and 37WEa), 3-car (types 36WE, 36WEa, 36WEb, 36WEd), 4-car (type 31WE), 5-car (type 45WE) and 6-car (type 35WE) trainsets, and also diesel and bi-mode 3-car (types 36WEhd and 36WEh, respectively) ones.

By the end of 2020, 190 Impulses were ordered.

Description
The Impuls family of trains are low-floor multiple units equipped with a full interior monitoring system, air-conditioning, passenger information system and can have ticket dispensers if requested.

Their interior is suitable for the needs of passengers with reduced mobility. It features sloping floors, folded steps, broad aisles and a designated space for wheelchairs and bicycles. In the vehicle,  motor bogies are used as well as Jacobs bogies (mounted between each two cars). The bogies have a modern  gear system and two-stage spring suspension systems that effectively muffles vibrations, thus enhancing comfort while travelling.

The trains can be built in various configurations. The two-car variant is known as "37WE", three-car "36WE", four-car "31WE", five-car "45WE" and six-car "35WE". The trains can have interiors equipped for commuter and suburban service but also for use on long-distance routes.

The first design was launched in 2012.

Newag launched a second generation of the design, named Impuls II, in 2017 with an order of 14 trainsets from Łódzka Kolej Aglomeracyjna.

The bi-mode version's top speed is 120 km/h in diesel mode and 160 km/h in electric mode.

Usage

See also 
 Newag
 Pesa Elf
 Stadler FLIRT

References

External links 

 Official Newag website

This article is based upon a translation of the Polish language version as at October 2015.

Articulated passenger trains
Electric multiple units of Poland
3000 V DC multiple units